Liberty County School District is a public school district that covers Liberty County, Florida. The mission of the school is to instill the love of learning, social responsibility, inspire integrity, and show respect to all students. As stated from the schools mission statement, "Our mission is to create an educational organization that functions with professionalism, integrity, pride and excellence."

School Board
The District School Board is elected on a non-partisan basis.  The Superintendent of Schools is a non-partisan elected position. As of 2022 the School Board members are as follows;
District 1:  James Flowers
District 2:  Jodi Bailey (Vice Chairperson)
District 3: Doobie Hays (Chairperson)
District 4: Boo Morris
District 5: Jason Singletary

Schools

The district operates the following public schools:

High school

Liberty County High School

Elementary/Junior High Schools

Hosford Elementary and Junior High School
W.R. Tolar K-8

Other programs

Liberty County Adult School
Horizons
Early Learning Center
Bristol Youth Academy

References

External links
 

School districts in Florida
Education in Liberty County, Florida